Georgios Bartzokas (alternate spellings: Giorgos, George, Mpartzokas) ( born June 11, 1965) is a Greek former professional basketball player and current head coach for Olympiacos of the Greek Basket League and the EuroLeague. He became the first Greek head coach to win the EuroLeague title, after winning the 2012–13 competition with Olympiacos.

Playing career
Barztokas played professional basketball in the Maroussi club, before some serious knee injuries (torn right knee ACL and later torn left knee ACL) ended his career at age 27.

Coaching career
Bartzokas began working as a basketball coach at the age of 22, while he was still also playing club basketball. He was the assistant coach of Panagiotis Giannakis for several years in Maroussi. In 2006, he signed on as the head coach of Olympia Larissa. That same year with Olympia, he managed to reach the playoffs of the Greek Basket League for the first time in the club's history. The team finished in 7th place, and repeated their playoffs qualification the next year, during the Greek Basket League 2007–08 season.

In 2009, Bartzokas became the head coach of Maroussi. In 2010, he was named the Greek League Best Coach. He became the head coach of Panionios in 2010.

Bartzokas became the head coach of the Greek EuroLeague club Olympiacos, in June 2012. With Olympiacos, he won the 2012–13 season championship of the EuroLeague, becoming the first Greek coach in history to win this title. He was also named the EuroLeague Coach of the Year in 2013. He also won the 2013 FIBA Intercontinental Cup with Olympiacos.

On July 5, 2015, Bartzokas signed a 2-year deal with PBC Lokomotiv Kuban of the VTB United League and the EuroLeague. In the EuroLeague, he coached the team to a first-ever Final Four appearance, after beating FC Barcelona 3–2 in the EuroLeague Playoffs.

On July 8, 2016, he signed a three-year contract with the Spanish team FC Barcelona of the Liga ACB. After one season, Barcelona parted ways with him. On June 30, 2017, Bartzokas returned to the VTB United League, in order to be the new head coach of the Russian club Khimki. He signed a two-year contract. On January 21, 2019 Bartzokas left Khimki, the contract was terminated.

On January 10, 2020, Barzokas returned to Olympiacos and he signed a 2 and a half year deal. After two months as a head coach the season was canceled due to the pandemic situation. In the 2020-21 season, Bartzokas tried to rebuild the team's roster after Sloukas return, but Olympiacos didn't qualify for the Play-off round of EuroLeague. In the 2021-22 season he won the Greek Cup with Olympiacos. That was his first national trophy. Shortly after he won the Greek Championship. In EuroLeague he qualified with Olympiacos to the Final Four of Belgrade.

Coaching record

EuroLeague

|- 
| align="left" |Maroussi
| align="left" |2009–10
|16||6||10|||| align="center" |Eliminated in Top 16 stage
|- 
| align="left" rowspan=3|Olympiacos
|- ! style="background:#FDE910;"
| align="left" |2012–13
|31||22||9|||| align="center" |Won EuroLeague Championship
|- 
| align="left" |2013–14
|29||20||9|||| align="center" |Eliminated in quarterfinals
|- 
| align="left" |Lokomotiv Kuban
| align="left" |2015–16
|31||21||10|||| align="center" |Won in 3rd place game
|- 
| align="left" |Barcelona
| align="left" |2016–17
|30||12||18|||| align="center" |Eliminated in the regular season
|- 
| align="left" |Khimki
| align="left" |2017–18
|34||17||17|||| align="center" |Eliminated in quarterfinals
|- 
| align="left" rowspan=3|Olympiacos
| align="left" |2019–20
|10||5||5|||| align="center" |Eliminated in Regular Season
|-
| align="left" |2020–21
|34||16||18|||| align="center" |Eliminated in Regular Season
|-
| align="left" |2021–22
|28||19||9|||| align="center" |4th place
|- class="sortbottom"
| style="text-align:center;" colspan="2"|Career||243||138||105|||| 
|}

Career achievements

Club Titles
Olympiacos
 EuroLeague Champion: (2013)
 FIBA Intercontinental Cup Champion: (2013)
 Greek League Champion: (2022)
 2× Greek Cup Winner: (2022, 2023)
 Greek Super Cup Winner: (2022)

Awards
 Greek League Best Coach: (2010)
2× EuroLeague Coach of the Year: (2013, 2022)

See also
 List of EuroLeague-winning head coaches

References

External links
 Georgios Bartzokas at acb.com 
 Georgios Bartzokas at euroleague.net
 Georgios Bartzokas at gpksports.com

1965 births
Living people
BC Khimki coaches
EuroLeague-winning coaches
FC Barcelona Bàsquet coaches
Greek basketball coaches
Greek men's basketball players
Maroussi B.C. players
Maroussi B.C. coaches
Olympiacos B.C. coaches
Olympia Larissa B.C. coaches
Panionios B.C. coaches
PBC Lokomotiv-Kuban coaches
Power forwards (basketball)
Liga ACB head coaches
Basketball players from Athens